Bogusława Orzechowska (born 1 February 1957) is a Polish politician. She was elected to the Senate of Poland (10th term) representing the constituency of Elbląg. She was also elected to the 9th term (2015–2019) of the Senate of Poland.

References 

Living people
1957 births
Place of birth missing (living people)
20th-century Polish politicians
21st-century Polish politicians
20th-century Polish women politicians
21st-century Polish women politicians
Members of the Senate of Poland 2015–2019
Members of the Senate of Poland 2019–2023
Women members of the Senate of Poland
People from Ostróda